Nicole Phungrasamee Fein (born February 19, 1974) is an American artist. She lives and works in San Francisco, California.

Early life and education

Nicole Phungrasamee Fein was born in Evanston, Illinois. She earned her Bachelor of Arts from Tufts University and her Bachelor of Fine Arts from the School of the Museum of Fine Arts, Boston. Fein received her Master of Fine Arts degree from Mills College.

Collections
Her work is included in the collections of the Whitney Museum of American Art, the Harvard Art Museums and the San Francisco Museum of Modern Art.

References

1974 births
Living people
21st-century American artists
21st-century American women artists